Strategies Against Architecture IV is a compilation album by Einstürzende Neubauten released on 7 December 2010. This album featured a retrospective overview of the band's work between 2002 and 2010. It is the fourth Einstürzende Neubauten release of in the Strategies Against Architecture series.

Track listing
Disc one
 "Perpetuum Mobile" (single version) - 4:31
 "Selbstportrait Mit Kater" (full version) - 7:49
 "Ein Leichtes Leises Säuseln" - 4:33
 "Youme & Meyou" (live) - 5:31
 "Dead Friends (Around The Corner)" (live) - 4:59
 "Insomnia" - 7:28
 "Party In Meck-Pomm" - 2:09
 "X" - 4:08
 "Floorpiece/Grundstück" - 4:27
 "Good Morning Everybody" - 4:45
 "Waiting For The Call" (live) - 3:57
 "Wo Sind Meine Schuhe?" (dub version) - 6:06
 "GS1 & GS2" - 6:35
 "Palast Der Republik" (live) - 2:36

Disc two
 "Sendezeichen Phase 3" - 1:03
 "Tagelang Weiss" - 6:27
 "Wenn Dann" - 3:11
 "Jeder Satz Mit Ihr Hallt Nach" - 3:47
 "Susej" - 4:47
 "Magyar Energia" - 3:29
 "Birth Lunch Death" - 3:22
 "Weil Weil Weil (Freie Radikale In Der Warteschleife)" - 3:46
 "Unvollständigkeit" (live) - 12:24
 "Let's Do It A Dada" - 5:55
 "Bertolt Brecht Und Der Weltempfängter" - 0:28
 "Musterhaus-Ausstellung" - 15:07
I. "Anarchitektur" 
II. "Et Cetera" 
III. "Weingeister" 
IV. "Tohu Wa Bohu"

References

Einstürzende Neubauten compilation albums
2010 compilation albums
Mute Records compilation albums